The capture of the tanker Tuapse occurred on 23 June 1954, when a civilian Soviet ship was captured and confiscated by the Republic of China Navy in the high seas near the Philippines and the sailors were detained in Taiwan for various periods with three deaths, until the last four were released in 1988.

Background
On 18 June 1949 during the Chinese Civil War, the Government of the Republic of China (ROC) declared the Closed Port Policy to establish an actual aerial and naval blockade of trade with the People's Republic of China (PRC) along the Chinese coast from Liao River to Min River area, which was extended to include Guangdong on 12 February 1950. The Executive Yuan issued an emergency measure applying to domestic vessels, crews and companies to strengthen the trade ban on China on 16 August 1950, however the Kuomintang government extended the practice to foreign vessels and even in the international waters against the international law of the sea and the admiralty laws.

The New York Times reported that 67 foreign civilian ships were attacked by local pirates between September 1949 and October 1954, as half of them were British vessels, whereas actually 141 interference incidents were reported by the Royal Navy in the routine "Formosa Strait Patrol" operations since October 31 1949, and recorded in 37 British diplomatic protestation documents, with each containing multiple protests up to seven attacks, showing the anti-British atmosphere within the ROC and the KMT high-rank circle, even on the armed intervention of the Royal Navy escorting the British vessels from ROCN warships. The Western Enterprise Incorporated (WEI), supported by the Office of Policy Coordination of the Central Intelligence Agency, assisted in the operations.

On 13 February 1951, a fleet of 3 ROCS destroyers under the direct orders of ROC President Chiang Kai-shek captured the Norwegian civilian cargo ship Hoi Houw at 24°13'N 123°18'E within Japanese waters among the Yaeyama Islands. On 17–19 February, the British civilian mercantile Nigelock (former HMS Nigella K19, Flower-class corvette), full of fruits and vegetables, and another freighter Josephine Moller were attacked by the ROC Anti-Communist National Salvation Army (ACNSA) gunboats near the Chekiang coast in the East China Sea, but both escaped. On 15 April 1951, the Panamanian civilian cargo ship Perico was captured by ROC Navy at 25°31'N 123°48'E, north of Taketomi Island. By 7 December 1952, Captain Robert Adam was also killed by machine gun without warning even though the British freighter Rosita had cooperated in the full stop off the Fuzhou sea lane; till next year, she was attacked again, marking her thirteenth time since 1950.

Nevertheless, the piracy activities of attack, killing and confiscation known to the Parliament of the United Kingdom, British Hong Kong and Australian media coverages intensified in the summer of 1953 after Joseph Stalin's death and the Korean Armistice Agreement. On 26 July, the British freighter Inchkilda (former SS Fort Wilhelmus N3-S-A2) was attacked by 3 ROC-ACNSA gunboats south of the Wuqiu region, and was rescued by HMS Unicorn (I72, light aircraft carrier) after receiving the distress call; then Inchkilda was intercepted by the ROC Navy again on 24 October 1954, but received British and American diplomatic support to be released. On 16 August 1953, Nigelock was captured by the ROC Navy toward the Magong military port in Penghu, but was rescued by HMS St Brides Bay (K600, Bay-class frigate); it was intercepted again by ROCS Huangpu PC-105 (PC-461-class submarine chaser) and was rescued by the destroyer HMS Cockade (R34) on 24 August. The Italian civilian freighter Maribu was also attacked by gunboats on 31 July 1953, and the Danish civilian freighter Heinrich Jessen on 9 August - both were hijacked first to the Kinmen sea area to shift members, then formally confiscated in Keelung. At 18:00, 4 October, 2 ROCS destroyers captured the Polish civilian oil tanker Praca with 9,019 tons of cargo at 21°06'N 122°48'E in the West Pacific Ocean, 125 nautical miles southeast of Taiwan. 29 Polish sailors and 17 Chinese sailors from the PRC were transferred to a military detention center in Zuoying.

In early April 1954, the ROC Air Force and Navy conducted a carpet search for the Czechoslovak civilian cargo ship Julius Fucik, but failed to catch her in the Yaeyama sea area of the Pacific Ocean. At 14:20, 12 May, another Polish civilian cargo ship Prezydent Gottwald with 7,066 tons of lathes and medicines was bombarded by a fleet of 3 ROCS destroyers, at 20°30'N, 128°07'E, east of Batanes Islands and south of Okinawa Island, then was bombarded again at 15:20 and captured at 23°45'N 128°35'E.  33 Polish sailors and 12 Chinese sailors from the PRC were first detained in Keelung, then transferred to Zuoying together.

The tanker Praca was renamed ROCS Helan (AOG-305) and the transport Prezydent Gottwald was renamed ROCS Tianzhu (AK-313), and both were commissioned into the ROC Navy. 61 out of 62 Polish sailors were released through Polish and United States diplomatic intervention, while one was found dead in a park with signs of torture, while the 29 Chinese sailors were imprisoned in the Green Island Prison. 11 were rescued by the International Committee of the Red Cross in 1956, 3 staff leaders were executed, 1 died in prison, and 5 died due to sickness or accidents. Eventually 5 survivors were released and returned to the PRC after martial law was lifted in 1987, and 4 chose to stay in Taiwan.

Capture
On 21 June 1954, the civilian tanker Tuapse with 49 crew members, which sailed from Odessa and was loaded with 11,702 tons of Romanian kerosene from Constanța in the Black Sea with the scheduled delivery to Shanghai and Vladivostok, arrived in Victoria Harbour in British Hong Kong to resupply. On 23 June it passed through the international seaway of Balintang Channel in Bashi Straits, eastbound toward the west Pacific Ocean. It was intercepted at  near Philippines by a ROC taskforce led by Admiral Ma Ji-zhuang, Commander-in-Chief of the Navy, in charge on board the flagship Tan Yang DD-12 (former Japanese Imperial Navy Yukikaze, transferred to ROCS after WWII), with the permission of President Chiang Kai-shek to sink the target if encountering resistance. Three rounds of 127 mm naval DP gun shots were fired near the bow to force the oil tanker in full stop, then an assault team led by Captain Chiu Zhong-ming (邱仲明上校, who had also led the assault on the Prezydent Gottwald two months earlier) with over 100 seamen and marines boarded to seize the ship, then Admiral Ma himself moved to Tuapse in command. Three sailors trying to save the Soviet flag ripped off by soldiers were struck down by rifle butts, and two engineers proceeding the mechanical self-destruction sequence were beat up hard by seamen breaking into the engineering room. The ship with its oil content was towed to the Port of Kaohsiung for intelligence examination with samples collected for chemical analysis in Okinawa, and the oil was immediately pumped out to the military storage. The crew, including the only female crew, bartender Olga Popov, were divided in 3 groups roughly by age to be transported to different locations for interrogation with no cross contact to each other allowed, and Captain Vitaly A. Kalinin cannot visit the other groups either. ROC military later declared that such isolation measures as required humanitarian help due to the captain ordering the crew in hunger strike protest.

Tuapse final distress signal before the radio station was silenced and smashed was transmitted through Vladivostok to Moscow and Odessa. Deputy Minister of Foreign Affairs of USSR, V.A. Zorin, summoned the Ambassador of USA, Charles Bowley in Moscow on 24 June 1954 to deliver a strong protest; the ROC Government admitted to the operation on 25 June. The Black Sea Shipping Company continued to distribute the victims' wages to their families throughout the following years.

British, Danish, Polish, Russian and other victim states' representatives to the United Nations denounced the conduct as piracy and "violation of freedom of navigation" in the General Assembly, but Polish and Russian appeals to the International Court of Justice did not succeed as ROC being a permanent member state of the UN Security Council could not fit in the traditional non-state "pirate" definition.  A Soviet task force of a destroyer and a frigate arrived offshore of Keelung Naval Base in early July, and the governments of Australia and New Zealand also expressed the concerns on ROC's actions providing the USSR a pretext to strengthen its naval presence in the western Pacific Ocean. U.S. Ambassador Karl L. Rankin in Taipei officially urged the release of ship and crew on 9 July, and visited the ROC Minister of Foreign Affairs, George Yeh in sick leave at home over night; Head of the Office of Chinese Affairs in USDOS, Walter P. McConaughy also talked with ROC Ambassador Wellington Koo on 16 July, Whereas the Ambassador of the United States to the United Nations, Henry Lodge later also recalled in the letter to Secretary of State Dulles that President President Eisenhower wrote several letters to Chiang to appeal for returning the tanker, but none of them could change Chiang's mind. Chiang Ching-kuo, the Director of Political Warfare Bureau, attempted to induce the statements of sailors to demand political asylum to score an epic propaganda victory with the Anti-Communist Hero image in the Cold War; The First Lady, Soong Mei-ling led the representatives of Chinese Women's Anti-Communist and Anti-Russian League to the persuasion visit. They were invited to a party in the Seven Seas Residence, rowing boats in the Bitan Lake, then the bar visits at nights, and the ladies were also offered along with videotaping for the propaganda record.

A declassified CIA briefing to the White House and United States National Security Council on 13 July revealed that the shipping insurance premium crossing the South China Sea had increased from 1% to 5% since 24 June after the Tuapse Incident, and certain international liners had been deterred midway at the Singapore Port unable to continue or had to change plans. The PLA Air Force moved in the Hainan Island for the first time in history to secure another transport route through Yulin and Huangpu ports, but accidentally shot down a Douglas DC-4 (VR-HEU) airliner of the Cathay Pacific Airways with 10 deaths on 23 July. Two U.S. aircraft carriers, USS Hornet and USS Philippine Sea (CV-47) arrived for a rescue mission on 26 July and shot down 2 PLAAF Lavochkin La-11 fighters east of Dazhou Island. On 2 August, Commander of PLA in CMC, Peng Dehuai convened an executive meeting to establish the tactical command for the East China Military Region as per Mao Zedong's directive to open another front.

The First Taiwan Strait Crisis started on 3 September 1954. On 8 September, A colonel arrived to announce the order of ROC Chief of the General Staff, General Peng Meng-ji (aka. "Kaohsiung Butcher" due to his brutality against civilians during the Feb. 28 Massacre and the White Terror era) to the crew, declaring that "The Third World War has begun - the tanker and cargo have been confiscated, and the crew are officially treated as prisoners of war", then they were beaten, tortured and received only starving rations, causing hearing, vision, teeth and finger damages. Sailor L. Anfilov lost all his teeth; N. Voronov tried to escape, but was seized and placed in a psychiatric facility and subjected to mock executions; Engineer Ivan Pavlenko slashed his own throat with a blade to commit suicide, but did not die. 20 young Ukrainian, Russian and Moldovan sailors under pressure signed an application demanding for political asylum in the United States.

On 8 September 1954, eight nations including the United Kingdom, United States, France, Australia, New Zealand, and the Philippines,... signed the Manila Pact to form the collective defense alliance Southeast Asia Treaty Organization (SEATO), but ROC was subsequently opposed and excluded, then was never able to join another regional security organization in the twentieth century. The adversities of crisis management argued the rational integrity within the policy making structure and processing among the government branches as various factors such as public opinions, moral principles, international laws, allies' positions, and policy announcements had little effects in consideration to avoid the contradiction accumulating until the outbreak of conflicts forcing in response and losing control on initiatives.

Development
The Battle of Yijiangshan Islands began on 18 January 1955 with Mikoyan-Gurevich MiG-15s and Ilyushin Il-10s scrambling for the aerial domination, followed by the decisive retreat in the Battle of Dachen Archipelago till 26 February.  The Kuomintang had lost the strategic control on the East China Sea, and the WEI was dissolved with the remaining intelligence operations transferred to the Naval Auxiliary Coordinations Center, (NACC) under the direct supervision of United States Navy. Secretary of State John F. Dulles arrived in Taiwan to meet President Chiang Kai-shek on 3 March as the Sino-American Mutual Defense Treaty came into force to secure the Taiwan Strait, and tried to persuade him to release the ship and the crew but Chiang still disagreed. The Soviet Government demanded the French Government mediate.  Another request was also made through the Swedish Red Cross. As a result of international joint efforts and pressure in 9 months (October 1 - July 26), Chiang eventually agreed to release 29 crew members who did not sign the asylum application, including Captain Kalinin. They were transferred through Taipei, Hong Kong, then arrived in Moscow by plane on 30 July.

Next day on 31 July, PRC returned 11 American servicemen who were on a USAF B-29 bomber shot down above the Yalu River area in North Korea on 12 January 1953. One day later on 1 August, the PRC ambassador to Poland, Wang Bingnan met the United States Ambassador to Czechoslovakia, U. Alexis Johnson in Geneva, Switzerland to establish the first direct communication channel in history later known as the "Warsaw Talks" for diplomatic normalization, which Chiang strongly opposed. One week later on 8 August, the United States Embassy to Japan began to investigate the piracy attack with casualties on the Ryukyuan fishery boat Daisan Seitoku Maru by two gunboats of about 40 soldiers wearing the ROC flags and uniforms on the disputed territorial water 25°44'N, 123°28'E of Senkaku Islands on 2 March, where the ROC-ACNSA shortly stationed after the Dachen Retreat, but the ROC Ministry of National Defense (MND) denied all the over fifty presented evidence, and claimed that they were framed by a PRC spy operation. The Japanese ship owner also arrived in Taipei to appeal a civil lawsuit, but was denied of compensation later.

Since 25 May 1955, the secret police of Bureau of Investigation and Statistics (BIS) under the command of Mao Renfeng had started to arrest the subordinates of General Sun Li-jen to interrogate with torture for being pro-American in an allegedly coup d'état to collaborate with the CIA to take control of Taiwan to declare the independence; till October, over 300 officers were arrested and imprisoned for the high treason by the conspired revolt with the Communist spies. Sun was also put in the house arrest for 33 years until 20 March 1988, only shortly before the release of the crew of Tuapse, Praca and Prezydent Gottwald.

Chiang was upset that the British merchandise liners still passing through the "Bandit Area" daily in October 1955, after the ROC Air Force bombing had sunk the British civilian ship Edendale in the Shantou Port on 19 January, so he ordered that the ROC Armed Forces can "sink one vessel to show that we are serious.". United States Senator Wayne Morse and Senator Estes Kefauver proposed to impose the United Nations Trusteeship of Taiwan to replace the Chiang's Kuomintang regime, which led to the 1959 Conlon Report by Robert A. Scalapino of the Harvard University recommending the independent Republic of Taiwan as a resolution, whereas Thomas Liao had convened the Provisional Congress of the Republic of Formosa in Japan on 1 September 1955, and elected the President of the Republic of Taiwan Provisional Government in Tokyo on 28 February 1956.

Tanker Tuapse was renamed ROCS Kuaiji (AOG-306), commissioned in the ROC Navy with 22 commissioned officers and 88 enlisted rank seamen on 20 October 1955, to deliver aviation fuel for ROCAF monthly alongshore before the transit pipeline across the island was constructed.  Taiwan Navigation Co., Ltd. tried to acquire the ship in 1960, but was turned down because the ship was registered as stolen vessel with the IMO/IMB, so it could not enter the territorial waters of UN countries; the ship was often idle in port. She was retired on 1 October 1965, and laid down permanently in Kaohsiung Harbor.

Aftermath
Chief telegraphist Michael Ivankov-Nikolov, accountant Nikolay I. Vaganov, Valentin A. Lukashkov, Viktor M. Ryabenko, Alexander P. Shirin, Mikhail I. Shishin, Viktor S. Tatarnikov, Venedikt P. Eremenko and Viktor Solovyov left with the assistance of the Church World Service to the United States in October 1955. Two of them appeared in a Voice of America (VOA) radio broadcast to criticize the Soviet system; but in April 1956, Vaganov, Lukashkov, Ryabenko, Shirin and Shishin appeared at the Soviet Embassy and returned to the USSR. Vaganov was arrested in 1963 for the Anti-Soviet agitation on the VOA broadcast, and sentenced by the Gorky Regional Court to ten years in prison for treason. He served seven years and was pardoned in 1970. In August 1992, the Presidium of the Nizhny Novgorod Regional Court recognized Vaganov as correctly convicted, but he was eventually rehabilitated by the Supreme Court of the Russian Federation.  Eremenko and Tatarnikov joined the United States Army. Solovyov settled in New York.

In 1959, the Odessa Regional Court sentenced in absentia the sailors who never returned USSR - Tatarnikov, Ivankov-Nikolov, Eremenko and Solovyov - to death for treason. After appearing in anti-Soviet speeches in Washington, D.C., Ivankov-Nikolov lost his mind and was handed over to the Soviet Embassy, returning to the USSR in 1959; he did not face judicial proceedings, since he was declared mentally ill and placed in a psychiatric hospital in Kazan, where he spent over 20 years.

Sailor L. F. Anfilov, Vladimir I. Benkovich, Pavel V. Gvozdik and N. V. Zibrov accepted an intelligence assignment to leave for Brazil with Polish passports by the end of 1957, then appeared at the Soviet Consulate in Uruguay to return USSR next year. However they were arrested after a press conference and sentenced to 15 years in prison for treason. Later the sentences were reduced to 12 years, and further released with a pardon in 1963. They were rehabilitated in 1990.

Sailor Valentin I. Kniga, Vsevolod V. Lopatyuk, Vladimir A. Sablin and Boris Pisanov, who withdrew the political asylum applications, were sentenced to 10 years in prison by the trial in absentia in a ROC court-martial as per the Martial Law system, which mandated all the civilian cases tried by the military courts. They spent seven years in prison before being placed under the guarded house arrest in various military quarters in Hsinchu and Tainan mountain areas till lastly to the Yilan suburb under the custody of Taiwan Garrison Command, where a ROC Foreign Ministry official spoke on condition of anonymity that they requested the political asylum in Taiwan and were being treated as refugees without torture. Following the Sino-Soviet split, Soviet journalist Victor Louis visited the Minister of National Defense, Chiang Ching-kuo in Taipei in October 1968, and was allowed to bring the sailors some family letters which they had not received for thirteen years; then held several meetings with the Minister of ROC Government Information Office, James Wei in Vienna after the Conflict of Zhenbao Island in March 1969 to achieve a mutual agreement on releasing all the remaining crew in ROC military custody in 1970; but this agreement was not honoured or realized, until after martial law was lifted, as the reporting of the Independence Evening Post and the advocacy of Amis legislator Tsai Chung-han drew attention to the situation.

With the new amnesty for all political prisoners issued by the first Taiwanese President Lee Teng-hui after late President Chiang Ching-kuo's death in 1988, they were finally released along with 5 Chinese detainees of the Praca and Prezydent Gottwald crews, and free to leave with the assistance of the Soviet Consul in Singapore, A. I. Tkachenko, to go home after 34 years in the military captivity. The last crew cook Vsevolod Lopatyuk accepted a teacher job offer with the ROC nationality, but returned Ukraine in 1993 after three years of bedridden sickness and a stroke.

Sailor Zhorka M. Dimov suffered from the continual beating and bleeding without medical care and committed suicide in 1975; Mikhail M. Kalmazan died of sickness afterwards; Anatoly V. Kovalev died in a psychiatric facility. Their corpses were not returned, except some family members receiving postal-mailed ashes in shock. Nevertheless, ROC military records claim the opposite, that they were well-treated and died of illnesses.

Over 100 years after its establishment in 1911, the Republic of China still does not have the legislation of the Refugee Law to regulate the political asylum process in accordance with international law, and the government has never apologized or compensated the families or the states of the victims as per the international law.

Legacy
The communication barriers with the Tuapse crew exposed the issue of lacking interpreters and translators in need, so Major-general Pu Dao-ming, who was processing the case, gave the detainees a radio to listen to the news, and received special permission to found the first Russian language course in Taiwanese history at the Foreign Language School of MND in 1957. The exceptional permission was extended later to the public institutes with scholarships offered for specified services, till the taboo finally disappeared with decades of accumulated outstanding practice merits, and the East European cultural and linguistic education are open to the civilian society and academies such as the academies of NCCU, CCU, TKU and FHK today. Pu died during a surgery before re-appealing to Chiang for the crew's release, on 24 May 1964.

The story of Tuapse was depicted in the film Ч. П. — Чрезвычайное происшествие (E.A. — Extraordinary Accident) in two parts in 1958, directed by Viktor Ivchenko where two actors were from the original crew, then became the top film of 1959 in the USSR, with 47.5 million viewers.

The ROC naval traffic blockade status ended on 12 September 1979; while the penalties and measures against the vessels, crews and companies involving in the trade with PRC remained until 15 January 1992.

In 1996, the Russian Government awarded a medal to each of the living Tuapse survivors.

ROCS Kuaiji (AOG-306) maintained the record as the largest vessel in the ROC Navy history with the 18,000 tons of displacement until 23 January 2015, when the modern ROCS Pan Shi (AOE-532) with the 20,630 tons of max. displacement launched in service.

The Central Naval Museum in Saint Petersburg preserves a model of the tanker Tuapse.

In 2005, a marble plaque in memory of Tuapse and her crew was erected in front of the passenger terminal building of the Odessa Port of Ukraine, where her final journey of no return began.

See also

 February 28 incident
 Kashmir Princess
 China Airlines Flight 334
 1987 Lieyu massacre
 Min Ping Yu No. 5540 incident
 Min Ping Yu No. 5202
 Chang Hsueh-liang
 Sun Li-jen
 Shih Ming-teh
 Lin Yi-hsiung
 Henry Liu

References

Further reading
 
 
 
 
 
 
 
 
 
 

1954 in Taiwan
1954 in military history
June 1954 events in Oceania
Collective punishment
Cover-ups
White Terror (Taiwan)
Cross-Strait conflict
Anti-communism in China
People killed in the Cold War
History of Taiwan
Soviet Union–United States relations
Piracy in the Pacific Ocean
Maritime incidents in 1954
China–Soviet Union relations
Taiwan–United States relations
1954 in the Soviet Union
International maritime incidents